is a former Japanese football player. He played for Japan national team.

He is not related to fellow footballer and who is also from Japan Kazuyoshi Miura.

Club career
Miura was born in Oita on 24 July 1974. After dropped out from Aoyama Gakuin University, he joined Yokohama Flügels in 1994. He became a regular player in 1995 and he mainly played as left midfielder. The club won the champions at 1994–95 Asian Cup Winners' Cup. In 1998, the club won Emperor's Cup. However the club was disbanded end of 1998 season due to financial strain, he moved to Yokohama F. Marinos. He moved to Tokyo Verdy in 2001. However his opportunity to play decreased behind Takahito Soma while Miura was away from the club for Japan national team. He moved to Vissel Kobe in 2005. Although he served as captain, his opportunity to play decreased in 2007. In August 2007, he moved to Yokohama FC was founded by Yokohama Flügels supporters. He retired end of 2010 season.

National team career
On 6 June 1999, Miura debuted for Japan national team against Peru. He also played at 1999 Copa America. In September 2000, he was elected Japan for Japan U-23 national team as over age for 2000 Summer Olympics. In October, he played at 2000 Asian Cup and Japan won the champions. In 2001, he played at 2001 Confederations Cup and Japan won the 2nd place. In 2003, he was elected Japan for the first time in 2 years. Although he played as left side-back, there were few opportunity to play behind Alessandro Santos. He was also elected Japan for 2004 Asian Cup won the champions and 2005 Confederations Cup. However he did not play in the match at both competition. He played 25 games and scored 1 goal for Japan until 2005.

Club statistics

National team statistics

 2000 Asian Cup (champions)
 2001 Confederations Cup
 2004 Asian Cup (champions)
 2005 Confederations Cup

Honors and awards
Japan
 AFC Asian Cup: 2000, 2004
 FIFA Confederations Cup Runner-up: 2001

References

External links

Japan National Football Team Database

1974 births
Living people
Aoyama Gakuin University alumni
Association football people from Ōita Prefecture
Japanese footballers
Japan international footballers
J1 League players
J2 League players
Yokohama Flügels players
Yokohama F. Marinos players
Tokyo Verdy players
Vissel Kobe players
Yokohama FC players
Olympic footballers of Japan
Footballers at the 2000 Summer Olympics
1999 Copa América players
2000 AFC Asian Cup players
2001 FIFA Confederations Cup players
2004 AFC Asian Cup players
2005 FIFA Confederations Cup players
AFC Asian Cup-winning players
Association football midfielders
Japanese football managers
J1 League managers
Vissel Kobe managers